Joe McGhie (28 June 1947 – 9 September 2019) was an Australian rules footballer who played with Footscray in the Victorian Football League (VFL). His brother Robbie McGhie played football for Richmond.

Notes

External links 		
		
		
		
		
		
		
1947 births
2019 deaths
Australian rules footballers from Victoria (Australia)		
Western Bulldogs players